Hydrocynus brevis, also known as the tigerfish, Nile tigerfish or Sahelian tigerfish, is a predatory freshwater fish distributed throughout Africa.

Appearance
The tigerfish is silver in colour when young, with thin black horizontal stripes and an elongated body that tapers at both ends.  As the fish grows, it will develop a bronze coloration and the stripes will fade.  The ventral and caudal fins have a slight red-orange tint, and the adipose fin is grey to black. It grows to a length of  SL.

Distribution
This species has a wide distribution. It is found from Senegal to Ethiopia, throughout the Nile. In Northeast Africa it is found in the Ghazal and Jebel systems, Sudan, as well as Baro River, Ethiopia. In Western Africa it is known from Chad, Niger/Bénoué, Volta, Senegal and Gambia.

Habitat and ecology
A demersal, potamodromous freshwater species, Hydrocynus brevis prefers open-water habitats. It feeds mainly on fish and shrimps, with smaller individuals consuming aquatic insects.

Population and conservation status
This species is rather common over most of its range, without any known widespread threats. There is, however, a conservation policy in place in Ghana, and one potential threat is overfishing, as well as deforestation and pollution. There currently is a lack of research regarding the population of the species and its range. Habitat maintenance and restoration may also be required.

References

Alestidae
Fish of Africa
Fish described in 1864
Taxa named by Albert Günther